A. Bhimsingh or Bhim Singh (1924–1978) was an Indian filmmaker who worked predominantly in Tamil cinema. Apart from Tamil, he made films in other languages that include 18 films in Hindi, 8 films in Telugu, 5 films in Malayalam and 1 film in Kannada. Hailing from Andhra Pradesh, he started his film career as an assistant editor with the film-making duo Krishnan–Panju in the late 1940s. Later, he became an assistant director before evolving as an independent director. His films mainly dealt with family and relationships. He made a series of films all of which started with the Tamil syllable pa, mainly with Sivaji Ganesan.

Personal life
Bhimsingh married Sona, the sister of Krishnan, in 1949. He had eight children with her; one of his eight children, B. Lenin is a film editor, and another son of his, B. Kannan, is a cinematographer, who is known for his frequent collaborations with many of Bharathiraja. Later, Bhimsingh's eldest son Naren married Panju's daughter. Bhimsingh was also married to actress Sukumari in 1959 and has a son Suresh Bhimsingh.

Filmography

Pa series 
Many of Bhimsingh's films began with the syllable Pa, starred Sivaji Ganesan, had music by Viswanathan–Ramamoorthy, and lyrics by Kannadasan. According to Ganesan, Bhimsingh hardly imagined that he would make a series of films that began with the letter Pa, implying that he "might have thought about it at first because his name starts with the same letter in Tamil. Later he might have decided to stay on with this letter for sentimental reasons."

As an actor 
1975: Cinema Paithyam

Recurring collaborators 
Bhimsingh frequently associated with the same crew members. These included the assistant director duo Thirumalai–Mahalingam (who later became proper directors on films produced and written by Bhimsingh), cinematographer G. Vittal Rao and editor A. Paul Duraisingam. Ganesan appeared in 18 films directed by Bhimsingh, starting with Raja Rani (1956).

Accolades
National Film Awards
 1959: President's silver medal for Best Feature Film in Tamil – Bhaaga Pirivinai
 1960: Certificate of Merit for Best Feature Film in Tamil – Kalathur Kannamma
1961: All India Certificate of Merit for the Second Best Feature Film – Paava Mannippu
 1961: Certificate of Merit for Second Best Feature Film in Tamil – Pasamalar
 1964: Certificate of Merit for Second Best Feature Film in Tamil – Pazhani

References

External links
 

Telugu film directors
Tamil film directors
1924 births
1978 deaths
20th-century Indian film directors
Malayalam film directors
Hindi-language film directors
Telugu film editors
Tamil film editors
People from Chittoor district
Film directors from Andhra Pradesh
Screenwriters from Andhra Pradesh
Film producers from Andhra Pradesh
People from Anantapur district
Film editors from Andhra Pradesh
20th-century Indian screenwriters